Blanche Nash (30 July 1902 – 19 June 1964) was a South African swimmer who was a national record holder in the 50 yards. She competed in the women's 100 metre freestyle and women's 300 metre freestyle events at the 1920 Summer Olympics. She was the first woman to represent South Africa at the Olympics.

References

External links
 

1902 births
1964 deaths
South African female freestyle swimmers
Olympic swimmers of South Africa
Swimmers at the 1920 Summer Olympics
20th-century South African women